Rhinotragus analis is a species of beetle in the family Cerambycidae. It was described by Jean Guillaume Audinet-Serville in 1833.

References

Rhinotragini
Beetles described in 1833